Shipka is a small military base near the city of Mukachevo (just outside a small village of Shenborn) in Ukraine.  In the past it was a Soviet base that served the Soviet-installed Dnepr radar. In 1992 it was rented to Russia for 15 years. In 2009 the base stopped transferring data to Russia because the Russian authorities refused to continue paying for land lease which was increased in 2006. Formally, in 2008 Russia denounced the Russia-Ukraine agreement about rocket warning systems. 

Currently it is a base of the State Space Agency of Ukraine, "Національне космічне агентство України. Західний центр радіотехнічного спостереження", formally part of Mukachevo.

References

External links
 Ukraine will be blind. Ekonomichna Pravda (Ukrayinska Pravda). June 3, 2013
 Ukraine plans to install radars of new generation before 2017 - NKAU chairman. Interfax Ukraine. June 5, 2013
 Expedition to the secret Dnepr radar. Hi-way. March 2, 2007
 Zakarpattia: Dnepr radar to this day works for Russia. Zakarpattia Portal. November 6, 2008

Zakarpattia Oblast
Russian and Soviet military radars
Military installations of Ukraine
Military installations of the Soviet Union
State Space Agency of Ukraine
Ukrainian airbases